Griff's Hamburgers, or Griff's Burger Bar, is a regional fast food chain founded in 1960 by Griff's of America, Inc. of Kansas City, Missouri, United States. At one time they had locations nationwide with the majority in the South near highway exits.

Griff's was named for the founder, HJ Griffith.

The restaurant buildings were of a patented A-frame design, produced by Valentine Diner of Wichita, Kansas. Later restaurants sported more conventional architecture. A bright yellow sign read HAMBURGERS in big block capitals. The restaurants offered both drive-thrus and patio dining.

Most of the stores were located in high traffic locations, such as near a highway off-ramp, or along Route 66. There was one on the corner of Caruthers and Independence in Cape Girardeau, Missouri in the 1960s, catty corner from old Central High School.

Cory Griffin Great Grandson of Griffs Founder Harold Griffith Relocated the Corporate headquarters for Griff's and change its name to now Griffs of America based in Dallas, Texas, and stores remain open in Bossier City, Ruston and Shreveport, Louisiana; Albuquerque, New Mexico; and Dallas, Fort Worth, Haltom City, Garland, Irving, Mesquite, and San Antonio, Texas. A location in Sedalia, Missouri closed in late 2011, and locations in Colorado closed in 2015.

The restaurant chain was featured in multiple installments of the Zippy the Pinhead comic strip; on November 15, 2004,  February 10, 2005 December 19, 2006, and September 2, 2007.

See also
 List of hamburger restaurants

References

External links
 

Fast-food hamburger restaurants
Restaurants in Missouri
Economy of Garland, Texas
History of Kansas City, Missouri